A dynasty is a series of rulers from one family.

Dynasty may also refer to:

Arts and media

Film and television
 Dynasty (film), a 1976 NBC television film
 Dynasty (Australian TV series), a 1970 Australian TV series
 Dynasty (1981 TV series), a 1980s American primetime television soap opera
 Dynasty (2017 TV series), a reboot of the 1980s series
 Dynasties (2002 TV series), a 2002 Australian television documentary series
 Dynasties (2018 TV series), a 2018 BBC nature television documentary series
The Affaire in the Swing Age, a 2003 Chinese TV series released in some regions as The Dynasty
 Dynasty Barry, fictional character in UK TV series Waterloo Road

Music
 Dynasty (association), a Finnish music association and record label
 Dynasty (band), a 1978–1989 American funk/soul R&B band
 Dynasty (hardcore band), an American Christian hardcore punk band formed in 2004
 Dynasty Tour, a 1979 concert tour by Kiss

Albums
 Dynasty (As They Sleep album), 2010
 Dynasty (Kaskade album) or the title song (see below), 2010
 Dynasty (Kiss album), 1979
 Dynasty (Stan Getz album) or the title song, 1971
 Dynasty (Two Steps from Hell album), 2007
 The Dynasty: Roc La Familia, by Jay-Z, 2000
 Dynasty (Yandel and Tainy album), 2021

Songs
 "Dynasty" (song), by Kaskade, 2010
 "Dynasty", by Elephante, 2016
 "Dynasty", by Rina Sawayama from Sawayama, 2020

Other media
 Dynasty (video game), a 1978 text-based strategy game for the Apple II computer
 Dynasty!, a 1979 video game identical to the game Reversi

Technology
 Dodge Dynasty, a mid-size sedan car
 Dynasty, a brand later owned by Maytag
 Dynasty IT, a neighborhood electric vehicle
 Hyundai Dynasty, a car built by Hyundai Motor Company

Sports
 Dynasty (horse), an Olympic medal-winning horse for Canada
 Dynasty (sports), a team that enjoys a period of dominance over the sport
 The Dynasty (professional wrestling), a professional wrestling stable
 Seoul Dynasty, a Korean esports team in the Overwatch League

Other uses
 Dynasty Foundation, a Russian private foundation for non-profit education and science development programs
 Dynasty, the callsign of China Airlines

See also
 Die-Nasty, a TV soap opera
The Dynasts, the only play by Thomas Hardy